Ai was a Swedish pop group mainly known for participating in Melodifestivalen 1999 with the song ”Bilder av dig”. The group's name came from the Japanese word Ai, which means love. The group consisted of Malin Holmgren, Helena Hellqvist, Josefine Sundström, Anna Suatan and Claudia Unda.

Discography

Singles

References

Swedish pop music groups
Melodifestivalen contestants of 1999